Chooks Fresh & Tasty was a Western Australian fast food chain that specialized in barbecued and fried chicken.

History
Chooks was originally a well known regional fast food brand named River Rooster. Operations began in Busselton and Margaret River in 1991. River Rooster stores were generally in areas that lacked popular fast food chains – namely Chicken Treat, Red Rooster or KFC.

Around 2003, the River Rooster name was dropped. The company felt they were not generating new transactions due to the similarity in brands with other outlets. The company started a competition where customers could submit new names to them for consideration, after which the current Chooks Fresh & Tasty name was adopted.

In October 2010, Chooks Fresh & Tasty was acquired by Quick Service Restaurant Holdings, which planned to rebrand the locations as Chicken Treat.

See also
 List of chicken restaurants
 List of restaurants in Australia

References

Barbecue restaurants
Defunct barbecue restaurants
Companies based in Perth, Western Australia
Restaurants disestablished in 2010
Defunct fast-food chains
Fast-food chains of Australia
Fast-food poultry restaurants
Restaurants established in 1991
Restaurants in Western Australia
Defunct restaurants in Australia
Australian companies disestablished in 2010
Australian companies established in 1991